Lasata is an estate in East Hampton, New York that was the childhood summer home of the then future First Lady of the United States Jacqueline Kennedy Onassis until she was about 12.

Description

The two-story, gray-stucco mansion (also known as the George Schurman house) at 121 Further Lane was built in 1917 on  two blocks from the Atlantic Ocean and three blocks from the Maidstone Club.

History

The house belonged to Jacqueline Kennedy Onassis's paternal grandparents John Vernou Bouvier Jr. (referred to as "the Major") and Maude Sergeant Bouvier. The Bouviers' first summer residence in East Hampton was a simple house called Wildmoor, on Apaquogue Road in Georgica, which the Major bought about 1910. In 1925 the Major's wife, Maude Sergeant (whose family line traces back to the Kent, England origins of East Hampton) bought the house. In 1926 the Bouviers joined the Maidstone Club. The Major was to formally buy the house from his wife in 1935 after inheriting money from his uncle Michel Charles "M. C." Bouvier.

The Bouviers said "Lasata" was a Native American name for "place of peace."

Jackie's father John Vernou Bouvier III married Janet Norton Lee at St. Philomena's Catholic Church (later called Most Holy Trinity Catholic Church) in East Hampton on July 7, 1928. They stayed at the Major's family compound and also rented nearby. Jackie was born on July 28, 1929 at Southampton Hospital in Southampton, New York.

Her name was a cross between the paternal side (taken from the three generations of "Jacks") and the Lee side of her mother. The Lees had a house on Lily Pond Lane also in East Hampton village. Jackie's sister Caroline Lee Bouvier was also born at the Southampton Hospital on March 3, 1933 while the family was staying at Lasata. Lee Radziwill later owned a home nearby on East Dune Lane from about 1988 until 2002 with her late husband, film director Herb Ross.

As the marriage of Jackie's parents broke apart in the 1930s (before a divorce became final in 1940), Jackie and Lee continued to spend their summers at the house. At the same time, the marriage of her maternal grandparents James Thomas Lee and Margaret A. Merritt also broke apart although they were not to formally separate.

Jackie was to be an accomplished horse rider during her stays at Lasata and her favorite horse was Danceuse, many photographs of which appear in the book Young Jackie by Olivia Harrison, Bert Morgan  The New York Times wrote in 1940 following a competition at Madison Square Garden:

Jacqueline Bouvier, an eleven-year-old equestrienne from East Hampton, Long Island, scored a double victory in the horsemanship competition. Miss Bouvier achieved a rare distinction. The occasions are few when a young rider wins both contests in the same show.

At age 10, Jackie was to write:

When I go down to the sandy shore
I can think of nothing I want more
Than to live by the booming blue sea
As the seagulls flutter around about me
I can run about when the tide is out
With the wind and the sea all about
And the seagulls are swirling and diving for fish
Oh-to live by the sea is my only wish

When her father died, she asked that daisies and bachelor's buttons in white wicker baskets be placed at St. Patrick's Cathedral, New York to make it look "like Lasata in August."

In the 1970s, the First Lady's sister Lee Radziwill discussed creating a documentary with Albert and David Maysles about Jacqueline's childhood in East Hampton. At about the same time their aunt, Edith Ewing Bouvier Beale and first cousin Edith Bouvier Beale made national attention when the National Enquirer ran an exposé on the deplorable conditions of their nearby home on West End Road. The Suffolk County, New York Board of Health made a raid ordering them to clean up the property which was falling into disrepair and was being overrun with feral cats.

The Maysles shot footage of the Beales and decided they would make better subjects for a documentary.   They scrapped the Bouvier family documentary and Lee Radziwill confiscated the initial footage of the Beales. However, the Maysles returned and refocused their documentary on the Beales. This footage became the 1975 documentary Grey Gardens.

The documentary was filmed after Jackie convinced Aristotle Onassis to donate $32,000 to fix the Beale house removing 10,000 bags of garbage.

Jackie's father, grandfather, grandmother, great-grandfather, and great-grandmother are buried at Most Holy Trinity Catholic Cemetery in East Hampton as is her maternal grandmother (and various other relatives including her aunt Edith Beale).

Jackie's mother Janet, following the death of her second husband Hugh D. Auchincloss, was to marry childhood friend Bingham Morris on October 29, 1979 and move to Southampton. Morris's first wife had been a bridesmaid at the East Hampton wedding of Jackie's parents. They separated in 1981. Jackie's daughter Caroline Kennedy bought a house in Sagaponack, New York in Southampton. Caroline and her husband, Edwin Schlossberg, sold the house in the summer of 2006.

Later years

The house is still privately owned and in 2006 it was offered for sale for $25 million. It is currently owned by former Coach design executive, Reed Krakoff, and his wife, Delphine.. The property was subdivided into one empty 4-acre plot and another with 7 acres and the house. Both plots sold in January 2018.

References

Bouvier family residences
Kennedy family residences
East Hampton (town), New York
Houses in Suffolk County, New York
Jacqueline Kennedy Onassis
Residential buildings completed in 1917